Michael Barnard (born 8 October 1976 from Sidcup, Greater London) is an English professional darts player who plays in the Professional Darts Corporation events.

Career

A winner of the World Youth Masters in 1991, Barnard joined the PDC circuit in late 2003 taking part in UK Open regionals, reaching the semi finals of the Scottish Regional and the quarter finals of the North West Regional. His performances helped him progress to the third round of the 2004 UK Open automatically where he narrowly lost 8–7 to Andy Jenkins. He then reached a semi final in the Midlands Regional for the 2005 UK Open as he entered the third round automatically once more, losing to Roland Scholten. He followed this with a quarter final showing in the Open Holland.

Barnard started his 2006 UK Open campaign in the second round, beating Nigel Langton 8–1. He then beat Lee Palfreyman in the third round to reach the fourth round for the very first time. He was drawn against Ronnie Baxter and lost 11–7. Poor form forced Barnard to begin his 2007 UK Open campaign in the first round where he beat Vernon Sheppard but lost in the second round to Paul Williams. He then lost in the preliminary round in the 2008 UK Open, losing to Paul Cooper.

Besides from the UK Open, Barnard had failed to qualify for any of the other PDC majors. This run ended when he won one of eight places to qualify for the 2009 PDC World Darts Championship. He was beaten by Andy Hamilton in round one.
Having finished the 2011 season ranked too low to retain his PDC tour card automatically, Barnard entered the PDC Q School in January 2012. On the second day Barnard earned his tour card for 2012 and 2013 by beating John Bowles 6–2 in the final stage.

In May 2012, Barnard earned a place in the German Darts Championship in Berlin by defeating Adrian Gray and James Richardson in the UK qualifier. He received a bye through the first round when Gary Anderson withdrew and then lost to Co Stompé in round two 6–5. He reached the last 32 of three other ProTour events during 2012, but could never advance beyond this stage. Barnard went into 2013 ranked world number 77.

Barnard failed to qualify for the 2013 UK Open as he finished 115th on the Order of Merit, outside of the top 96 who claimed their places. He reached the main stage of two European Tour events during the year, the first being a 6–2 opening round defeat to Andy Smith at the German Darts Championship. The other was at the Dutch Darts Masters where Barnard defeated Stuart Kellett 6–3 and Kevin Painter 6–4 to record his best finish of 2013 by reaching the last 16. He faced world number two Michael van Gerwen and was defeated 6–1. Barnard once again entered Q School to remain on the PDC Tour as he was ranked 82nd in the world after the 2014 World Championship outside the top 64 on the Order of Merit. His best result during the four days came on the final day when he lost in the last 16 5–3 to Jason Hogg, a result which saw him finish inside the top 24 on the Q School Order of Merit to earn a fresh two-year tour card.

Barnard was beaten 5–1 by Stuart Kellett in the second round of the 2014 UK Open. He qualified for the Dutch Darts Masters and lost 6–5 to Vincent van der Voort in the first round. Barnard reached the last 32 of Pro Tour events three times during the year but was knocked out on each occasion. He participated in the 2015 German Darts Championship, but was knocked out 6–5 by Joe Murnan in the opening round. Barnard's deepest run in 2015 came at the 15th Players Championship where he was eliminated in the last 16 6–5 by Devon Petersen.

Barnard qualified for the 2016 International Darts Open, but lost 6–5 to Mike Holz in the first round. He reached the final of the 13th Challenge Tour event and was beaten 5–1 by Rob Cross.

World Championship results

PDC

 2009: First round (lost to Andy Hamilton 0–3)
2019: Second round (lost to Jermaine Wattimena 0–3)

Performance timeline

References

External links

1976 births
English darts players
Living people
Professional Darts Corporation former tour card holders